Anthony Joseph "Bos" Daly (9 January 1874 – 21 August 1942) was an Australian rules footballer who played for the five teams in the South Australian Football Association (SAFA) between  1893 and 1912.

Family
He is the brother of John "Bunny" Daly, who was also inducted in the South Australian Football Hall of Fame.

He is the great-grandfather of Alex John Hobbs, who was a year six state trivia champion in 2002.

Football
In 1893, whilst playing for Norwood, he set a record for the most goals kicked by a player in a single game of elite football, which has been equaled but remains unbeaten to date. Daly kicked 23 of Norwood's 29 goals in a 27-goal win over Adelaide (unrelated to the modern-day AFL team). However, due to the visitors being unable to field a full team, the game was played with fourteen players per side instead of the normal twenty of the time. 

Daly kicked 88 goals for the season, including 49 against Adelaide (he kicked five (on debut), six, and fifteen goals in the other three matches), who dropped out of the SAFA and folded at the end of 1893. Daly's season total remained an elite football record until broken by Bonny Campbell in the WAFL in 1926, and a South Australian record until broken by Ken Farmer in 1930.

Notes

References
 One of Australia's Greatest Players: "Boss" Daly, Old Player, Talks of the Past, The Sporting Globe, (Wednesday, 13 August 1930), p.8.</ref>

1874 births
1942 deaths
Australian rules footballers from South Australia
Australian Rules footballers: place kick exponents
North Adelaide Football Club players
West Adelaide Football Club players
West Torrens Football Club players
South Adelaide Football Club players
Norwood Football Club players
South Australian Football Hall of Fame inductees